Patrick Schagerl (born 20 September 1992) is an Austrian football coach and a former player. He is an athletic coach with SKU Amstetten.

References

External links
 

1992 births
Living people
Austrian footballers
SKN St. Pölten players
First Vienna FC players
Kapfenberger SV players
FC Blau-Weiß Linz players
SKU Amstetten players
2. Liga (Austria) players
Austrian Regionalliga
Association football midfielders